Muḥammad Isḥāq Bhaṭṭī (Urdu: ‎; Muhammad Ishaq Bhatti; March 15, 1925 – December 22, 2015) was Pakistani Islamic scholar, journalist, historian and biographer of Islamic scholars. He was one of the leading writers of Islamic scholars in the Indian subcontinent.

Biography 
Muhammad Ishaq Bhatti was born on 15 March 1925 in Kotkapura in the state of Faridkot (present day Faridkot, Punjab) into a religious family. His father, Abdul Majeed and grandfather, Muhammad were religious person. Bhatti learnt Quran at home from his grandfather.

In 1947, Bhatti moved to Pakistan from India with his family.

Works 
Bhaṭṭī has written several books in Urdu, including:

Bibliography

Further reading

References 

People from Faridkot, Punjab
2015 deaths
1925 births
Pakistani people of Indian descent
20th-century Pakistani historians
Pakistani Islamic religious leaders
Indian Sunni Muslim scholars of Islam
Pakistani Sunni Muslim scholars of Islam
Sunni Muslim scholars of Islam
Ahl-i Hadith people
21st-century Pakistani historians